Popetre is a village in the City Municipality of Koper in the Littoral region of Slovenia.

The local church is dedicated to Saint Andrew and belongs to the Parish of Truške.

References

External links
Popetre on Geopedia
 https://web.archive.org/web/20131112185843/http://www.popetre.com/

Populated places in the City Municipality of Koper